The PMPC Star Award for Best Celebrity Talk Show is given to the best television celebrity talk show of the year and also celebrity talk show hosts.

Winners

Celebrity Talk Show

1988: Not So Late Night with Edu (ABS-CBN 2)

1989: Martin After Dark (GMA 7)

1990: Mel & Jay (ABS-CBN 2)

1991: Martin After Dark (GMA 7)

1992: Mel & Jay (ABS-CBN 2)

1993: Martin After Dark (GMA 7)

1994: 

1995: Mel & Jay (ABS-CBN 2)

1996:

1997:

1998: Partners Mel and Jay (GMA 7)

1999: 

2000: Partners Mel and Jay (GMA 7) and Today With Kris Aquino (ABS-CBN 2) [tied]

2001: Partners Mel and Jay (GMA 7)

2002: Private Conversations (ABS-CBN 2)

2003: Morning Girls with Kris and Korina (ABS-CBN 2)

2004: Morning Girls with Kris and Korina (ABS-CBN 2)

2005: Homeboy (ABS-CBN 2)

2006: Homeboy (ABS-CBN 2)

2007: Sis (GMA 7)

2008: Boy and Kris (ABS-CBN 2)

2009: Sis (GMA 7)

2010: Spoon (Net 25)

2011: MOMents (Net 25)

2013: Kris TV (ABS-CBN 2)

2014: Gandang Gabi Vice (ABS-CBN 2)

2015: Aquino & Abunda Tonight (ABS-CBN 2)

2016: Tonight with Boy Abunda (ABS-CBN 2)

2017: Gandang Gabi Vice (ABS-CBN 2)

2018:  Tonight with Boy Abunda (ABS-CBN 2)

2019:  Tonight with Boy Abunda (ABS-CBN 2)

2021:  Tonight with Boy Abunda (ABS-CBN 2)

Celebrity Talk Show Hosts

1988: Edu Manzano (Not So Late Night with Edu / ABS-CBN 2)

1989: Martin Nievera (Martin After Dark / GMA 7)

1990: Jay Sonza and Mel Tiangco (Mel & Jay / ABS-CBN 2)

1991: Martin Nievera (Martin After Dark / GMA 7)

1992: Jay Sonza and Mel Tiangco (Mel & Jay / ABS-CBN 2)

1993: Martin Nievera (Martin After Dark / GMA 7)

1994: 

1995: Kris Aquino (Actually Yun Na! / RPN 9)

1996:

1997:

1998: Jay Sonza and Mel Tiangco (Partners Mel & Jay / GMA 7)

1999: 

2000: Kris Aquino (Today With Kris Aquino / ABS-CBN 2) & Jay Sonza and Mel Tiangco (Partners Mel & Jay / GMA 7) [tied]

2001: Jay Sonza and Mel Tiangco (Partners Mel & Jay / GMA 7)

2002: Boy Abunda (Private Conversations / ABS-CBN 2)

2003: Kris Aquino and Korina Sanchez (Morning Girls with Kris and Korina / ABS-CBN 2)

2004: Kris Aquino and Korina Sanchez (Morning Girls with Kris and Korina / ABS-CBN 2)

2005: Boy Abunda (Homeboy / ABS-CBN 2)

2006: Boy Abunda (Homeboy / ABS-CBN 2)

2007: Boy Abunda (Homeboy / ABS-CBN 2)

2008: Boy Abunda and Kris Aquino (Boy and Kris / ABS-CBN 2)

2009: Janice de Belen (Spoon / Net 25)

2010: Janice de Belen (Spoon / Net 25)

2011: Janice de Belen (Spoon / Net 25)

2012: Kris Aquino (Kris TV / ABS-CBN 2) as "Best Female Showbiz Oriented/Celebrity Talk Show Host" & Vice Ganda (Gandang Gabi Vice / ABS-CBN 2) "Best Male Showbiz Oriented/Celebrity Talk Show Host"

2013: Vice Ganda (Gandang Gabi Vice / ABS-CBN 2)

2014: Vice Ganda (Gandang Gabi Vice / ABS-CBN 2)

2015: Boy Abunda and Kris Aquino (Aquino & Abunda Tonight / ABS-CBN 2)

2016: Boy Abunda (Tonight with Boy Abunda / ABS-CBN 2)

2017: Boy Abunda (Tonight with Boy Abunda / ABS-CBN 2)

2018: Boy Abunda (Tonight with Boy Abunda / ABS-CBN 2)

2019: Boy Abunda (Tonight with Boy Abunda / ABS-CBN 2)

2021: Boy Abunda (Tonight with Boy Abunda / ABS-CBN 2)

PMPC Star Awards for Television